Seduction is an album released in February 2009 featuring love songs by Frank Sinatra, from his own recording company, Reprise.

Track listing
"Prisoner of Love" (3:54)
"I've Got You Under My Skin" (3:32)
"My Funny Valentine" (2:31)
"Witchcraft" (2:37)
"All the Way" (3:32)
"It Had to be You" (3:53)
"Young at Heart" (2:56)
"Love Is a Many-Splendored Thing" (3:54)
"Some Enchanted Evening" (3:27)
"How Little It Matters" (2:23)
"I Get a Kick Out of You" (3:13)
"The Second Time Around" (3:09)
"At Long Last Love" (2:41)
"I Concentrate on You" (2:39)
"Then Suddenly Love" (2:23)
"They Can't Take That Away from Me" (2:42)
"A Fine Romance" (2:13)
"More" (3:04)
"This Happy Madness" (3:02)
"Teach Me Tonight" (3:48)
"All the Way Home" (3:55)
"That's All" (3:23)

Re-recordings 
Several of the songs on this album were re-recorded by Sinatra from his Capitol Records recordings:
"They Can't Take That Away from Me"
"I Get a Kick out of You"
"Young at Heart"
"All the Way"
"I've Got You Under My Skin"

2009 compilation albums
Frank Sinatra compilation albums